Cullen is a surname of Irish and Gaelic origin. 

Considered by many to mean "handsome," Cullen is better linked to the Ancient Gaelic name Cuileannain which means "son of the holy one." It is thought to be derived from the pre 8th century Old Gaelic name O' Cuileannain or Ó Cuilinn, with the prefix O' indicating a male descendant of, plus the personal byname Cuilleannain. The name may also be related to Cullinane. While Cullen is encountered primarily in Dublin and southeast Ireland, Cullinan or Cullinane used almost exclusively in western Ireland on a north–south-Axis from Galway to Cork. A distribution map of the name has been processed on a genealogy site.

Cullen is also found as an ancient surname in Scotland and England; an example being the Baronets Cullen.

People with the surname Cullen

A 
Adam Cullen, Australian artist
Alexander Lamb Cullen (1920–2013), British electrical engineer
Alice Cullen (politician), UK politician
Archibald Howard Cullen, bishop of Grahamstown, South Africa

B 
Bill Cullen, American game show host
Bill Cullen (businessman), Irish businessman and philanthropist
Brett Cullen, American actor
Bud Cullen, Canadian Federal Court judge

C 
Charles Cullen, nurse and serial killer
Christian Cullen, New Zealand rugby player
Countee Cullen, African American poet of the Harlem Renaissance

D 
Dan Cullen, Australian cricketer
Danny Cullen, Irish hurler

E 
Edgar M. Cullen, Chief Judge of the New York Court of Appeals, 1904–1913
Eric Cullen, Scottish comedy actor

F 
Francis Cullen, American criminologist

G 
Geoff Cullen (born 1977), Australian cricketer
Gordon Cullen, English architect

H 
Helen F. Cullen (1919–2007), American mathematician
Hugh Roy Cullen, American oil businessman and philanthropist

I 
Ian Cullen (1939–2019), British actor

J 
Jack Cullen, American baseball pitcher
James Cullen (mathematician), described Cullen numbers
James Cullen (PTAA), founder of the Pioneer Total Abstinence Association
James P. Cullen, US brigadier general
Jane Lunnon, maiden name Cullen (born 1969), English headmistress
Joe Cullen (American football), American football coach
Joe Cullen (darts player) (born 1989), English darts player
John Cullen (disambiguation), several people
John Michael Cullen, Australian ornithologist
Jonathan Cullen, English actor
Joseph Cullen, Australian politician

L 
Leo Cullen (rugby union), Irish rugby player
Lori Cullen, Canadian singer-songwriter

M 
Matt Cullen, NHL hockey player
Martin Cullen, Irish politician
Maurice Cullen (boxer), English boxer
Michael Cullen (disambiguation), several people
Mick Cullen, Scottish footballer
Mortimer A. Cullen (1891–1954), New York politician

N 
Nathan Cullen, Canadian Member of Parliament
Nigel Cullen (1917–1941), Australian fighter ace
Nora Cullen (1905–1990), Argentine actress

P 
Paul Cullen (bishop), 19th-century Irish cardinal
Paul Cullen (rugby league), rugby coach
Peter Cullen, voice actor, Optimus Prime in Transformers
Philippa Cullen, Australian performance artist

R 
Robert Cullen (footballer), Irish-Japanese football player

S 
Sarah Cullen, British television journalist
Seán Cullen, Canadian comedian

T 
Thomas H. Cullen, United States Representative
Tim Cullen, American baseball player
Timothy Cullen (Wisconsin politician), American state senator
Tina Cullen, English hockey player

W 
William Cullen, Baron Cullen of Whitekirk (born 1935), Lord President of Scotland's Court of Session

Fictional characters 
 Edward Cullen, character in the Twilight series by Stephenie Meyer
 Linden Cullen, character from Holby City series
 Cullen Rutherford, character in the fantasy role-playing video game Dragon Age
 Cullen Bohannon, character in the western drama ‘’Hell on Wheels

See also
 Baron Cullen of Ashbourne, title in the Peerage of the United Kingdom
 Cullen (disambiguation)
 Cullenite

References

External links
Cullen Surname Origins by Jim Cullen

English-language surnames
Anglicised Irish-language surnames
Surnames of Irish origin